Pinerolo railway station serves the town and comune of Pinerolo, in the Piedmont region, northwestern Italy. The station is a through station of the Turin-Pinerolo-Torre Pellice railway.

Since 2012 it serves line SFM2, part of the Turin metropolitan railway service.

Services

References

Railway stations opened in 1854
1854 establishments in the Kingdom of Sardinia
Buildings and structures in Pinerolo
Railway stations in the Metropolitan City of Turin